The image segmentation problem is concerned with partitioning an image into multiple regions according to some homogeneity criterion. This article is primarily concerned with graph theoretic approaches to image segmentation applying graph partitioning via  minimum cut or maximum cut. Segmentation-based object categorization can be viewed as a specific case of spectral clustering applied to image segmentation.

Applications of image segmentation
 Image compression
 Segment the image into homogeneous components, and use the most suitable compression algorithm for each component to improve compression.
 Medical diagnosis
 Automatic segmentation of MRI images for identification of  cancerous regions.
 Mapping and measurement
 Automatic analysis of remote sensing data from satellites to identify and measure regions of interest.
 Transportation
 Partition a transportation network makes it possible to identify regions characterized by homogeneous traffic states.

Segmentation using normalized cuts

Graph theoretic formulation
The set of points in an arbitrary feature space can be represented as a weighted undirected complete graph G = (V, E), where the nodes of the graph are the points in the feature space. In this context, we can formulate the image segmentation problem as a graph partitioning problem that asks for a partition  of the vertex set , where, according to some measure, the vertices in any set  have high similarity, and the vertices in two different sets  have low similarity.

Normalized cuts
Let G = (V, E, w) be a weighted graph. Let  and  be two subsets of vertices.

Let:

 

 

 

Since , a cut  that minimizes  also maximizes .

Computing a cut  that minimizes  is an NP-hard problem. However, we can find in polynomial time a cut  of small normalized weight  using spectral techniques.

The ncut algorithm
Let:

 

After some algebraic manipulations, we get:

 

subject to the constraints:
 , for some constant 
 

Minimizing  subject to the constraints above is NP-hard. The relaxed problem can be solved by solving the generalized eigenvalue problem  for the second smallest generalized eigenvalue.

The partitioning algorithm:
 Solve  for eigenvectors with the second smallest eigenvalues.
 Use the eigenvector with the second smallest eigenvalue to bipartition the graph (e.g. grouping according to sign).
 Decide if the current partition should be subdivided.
 Recursively partition the segmented parts, if necessary.

Computational Complexity
Solving a standard eigenvalue problem for all eigenvectors (using the QR algorithm, for instance) takes  time. This is impractical for image segmentation applications where  is the number of pixels in the image.

Since only one eigenvector, corresponding to the second smallest generalized eigenvalue, is used by the uncut algorithm, efficiency can be dramatically improved if the solve of the corresponding eigenvalue problem is performed in a matrix-free fashion, i.e., without explicitly manipulating with or even computing the matrix W, as, e.g., in the Lanczos algorithm. Matrix-free methods require only a function that performs a matrix-vector product for a given vector, on every iteration. For image segmentation, the matrix W is typically sparse, with a number of nonzero entries , so such a matrix-vector product takes  time.

For high-resolution images, the second eigenvalue is often ill-conditioned, leading to slow convergence of iterative eigenvalue solvers, such as the Lanczos algorithm. Preconditioning is a key technology accelerating the convergence, e.g., in the matrix-free LOBPCG method. Computing the eigenvector using an optimally preconditioned matrix-free method takes  time, which is the optimal complexity, since the eigenvector has  components.

Software Implementations

OBJ CUT

OBJ CUT is an efficient method that automatically segments an object. The OBJ CUT method is a generic method, and therefore it is applicable to any object category model.
Given an image D containing an instance of a known object category, e.g. cows, the OBJ CUT algorithm computes a segmentation of the object, that is, it infers a set of labels m.

Let m be a set of binary labels, and let  be a shape parameter( is a shape prior on the labels from a layered pictorial structure (LPS) model). An energy function  is defined as follows.

   (1)

The term  is called a unary term, and the term  is called a pairwise term.
A pairwise term consists of a prior  and a contrast term .

The best labeling  minimizes , where  is the weight of the parameter .

   (2)

Algorithm
 Given an image D, an object category is chosen, e.g. cows or horses.
 The corresponding LPS model is matched to D to obtain the samples 
 The objective function given by equation (2) is determined by computing  and using 
 The objective function is minimized using a single MINCUT operation to obtain the segmentation m.

Other approaches
 Jigsaw approach
 Image parsing 
 Interleaved segmentation 
 LOCUS 
 LayoutCRF 
 Minimum spanning tree-based segmentation

References

Object recognition and categorization
Image segmentation